Microbacter margulisiae  is a Gram-negative, anaerobic, non-spore-forming and non-motile bacterium from the genus of Microbacter which has been isolated from sediments from the Tinto River in Huelva in Spain.

References

External links 
Type strain of Microbacter margulisiae at BacDive -  the Bacterial Diversity Metadatabase

Bacteroidia
Bacteria described in 2014